Ramil Islamov (born 21 August 1973) is a Uzbekistani wrestler. He competed at the 1996 Summer Olympics and the 2000 Summer Olympics. He was affiliated with CSKA Novosibirsk.

References

External links
 

1973 births
Living people
Uzbekistani male sport wrestlers
Olympic wrestlers of Uzbekistan
Wrestlers at the 1996 Summer Olympics
Wrestlers at the 2000 Summer Olympics
Place of birth missing (living people)
Asian Games medalists in wrestling
Wrestlers at the 1998 Asian Games
Asian Games silver medalists for Uzbekistan
Medalists at the 1998 Asian Games
World Wrestling Championships medalists
Armed Forces sports society athletes
20th-century Uzbekistani people